Patrick Thomas Leonard (1828 – March 1, 1905) was a United States Army sergeant who received the Medal of Honor during the Indian Wars.  Until 1984, it was believed that Leonard was a double recipient of the Medal of Honor.  However, another Irishman, Patrick James Leonard had also received the Medal of Honor.

Early life and education
Leonard was born in Broadford, County Clare, Ireland to John and Mary Leonard.

Marriage and Family
Patrick Thomas Leonard married Ellen Connaughton. Together they had five children: Mary, Patrick Thomas Leonard Jr., Margaret, John (Ireland) and Ellen M. (New York).

Military career
Leonard enlisted at Camp Three Forks, Idaho Territory, and was stationed there during the late 1860s and early 1870s.  His actions as a corporal at Grace Creek near Fort Hartsuff, Nebraska on April 28, 1876, lead to him being awarded the Medal of Honor on August 26, 1876.  By the time of his death, he had been promoted to sergeant, as can be seen on his gravestone.

Death and legacy
Leonard died on March 1, 1905, and was buried in Mount Calvary Cemetery, Lansing, Kansas.

Medal of Honor citation
Rank and organization: Corporal, Company A, 23d U.S. Infantry. Place and date: Near Fort Hartsuff, Nebr., April 28, 1876. Entered service at:------. Birth: Ireland. Date of issue: August 26, 1876.

Citation:

Gallantry in charge on hostile Sioux.

See also

List of Medal of Honor recipients
List of Medal of Honor recipients for the Indian Wars

References

1828 births
1905 deaths
19th-century Irish people
Irish soldiers in the United States Army
People from County Clare
United States Army Medal of Honor recipients
Irish emigrants to the United States (before 1923)
Wars involving the indigenous peoples of North America
Irish-born Medal of Honor recipients
United States Army soldiers
American Indian Wars recipients of the Medal of Honor